Montgomery Center is an unincorporated village in the town of Montgomery, Franklin County, Vermont, United States. Montgomery Center has a post office with ZIP code 05471.

References

Unincorporated communities in Franklin County, Vermont
Unincorporated communities in Vermont